George Robert Fouché (born 15 May 1965 in Pretoria, South Africa), nicknamed "Fast Fouché", is a former South African and international motorsport racecar driver and South African Formula 1 Powerboat pilot. He retired from competition in 2005.

George Fouché grew up on his father's brick factory, and by the age of 6 he was able to drive a bulldozer. His passion for motorsport began when he started driving go-carts in races at the age of 8. This continued until he was able to race cars at the age of 16.

At 16 he got his first competition licence from Motorsport South Africa and started competing in motorsport while he was still not allowed to drive on public roads.

George has a very large scar over his left eye that many   believe is a result of a motorsport accident. In fact, he got the scar when on his 8th birthday - he was teaching someone to drive a tractor. While teaching him, the tractor accidentally jerked and George fell off and the tyre rode over the side of his head, causing a massive cut that went halfway around his head.
 
Due to his extensive travels between Japan and South Africa, he was actually booked on the ill-fated South African Airways Flight 295, The Helderberg, which crashed off Mauritius on 28 November 1987 en route from Taiwan to South Africa, but missed the flight when his connecting flight from Japan to Taiwan was cancelled due to a typhoon.

On 2 April 2007, he suffered a perforated ulcer which was misdiagnosed as pancreatitis. He spent 63 days in intensive care in Montana Hospital, Pretoria, South Africa and was released on 6 June 2007.

International racing career

At 17, he raced in the Kyalami World Sportscar Championship 1000 km on 10 December 1983 in a Kremer Racing Porsche CK5 with co-drivers Franz Konrad and Kees Kroesemeijer, but was disqualified for a push start.

While racing in round three of the 1989 Fuji Long Distance Series, George came across the burning car of Oscar Larrauri that had just crashed. Oscar was still in the car, and noticing that the marshals were not equipped to deal with the fire, George stopped his car and pulled Oscar out. George eventually finished 2nd in the race, which would eventually cost him the championship. George received an impromptu "The Hero Award" from the Japanese Automobile Federation while on the podium.

While qualifying for the Fuji 1000 km race in October 1992, one of his car's tyres burst, sending him head-on into a concrete wall at 280 km/h. George's foot was crushed and he spent 7 months on crutches.

In 1993, George test drive the Sasol Jordan Grand Prix Formula 1 car at the Silverstone Circuit in England.

24 Hours of Le Mans

World Sportscar Championship (Europe)

All Japan Sports Prototype Championship (Japan)

Fuji Long Distance Series

Imsa

He competed in the 2nd round of the 1993 Imsa series in Miami alongside Wayne Taylor in an Intrepid RM1 Chevrolet GTP. They finished 5th.

He also competed in the 1994 24 Hours of Daytona alongside fellow South Africans, Hilton Cowie and Stephan Watson driving a Lotus Esprit S300 in the GTU class. On the 354 lap the car suffered engine failure.

South African racing career

F1 Powerboat (South Africa)
Sascar  2000 Champion
Wesbank V8
 Formula Atlantic

George competed in the South African Formula Atlantic Championship in 1983 before starting his international career in the World Sportscar Championship in Europe in 1984.

Group One Racing
Group N
Formula Ford
Rally

Post racing career

He now owns Dermalamp South Africa, a company that manufactures and sells phototherapy equipment for the management of Psoriasis and Eczema.

References

South African racing drivers
24 Hours of Le Mans drivers
Sportspeople from Pretoria
1965 births
Living people
World Sportscar Championship drivers